Negotino is a town in North Macedonia, the seat of the Negotino Municipality. Its population is about 13,000.

Geography
Negotino is located on the right side of the river Vardar.

Negotino is in a vineyard region and the gates of the Tikvesh basin, known for its fertility, are located nearby. Along with Kavadarci, Negotino is known as the home of North Macedonia's best wine and rakija (brandy).

The A1 highway leads through the city, parallel to the railway line connecting Skopje-Gevgelija-Greece.

Industry

Wine 
Negotino has an annual production of 20-25 million kilograms of grapes. The most common grape types are Chardonnay, Riesling, Sauvignon Blanc, Traminec, Smederevka, Muscat, Cabernet Sauvignon, Merlot, Pinot Noir, Plavac Mali, Vranec and Kadarka. Some of the more bigger wineries in terms of production are Bovin (Macedonian: Бовин), Lazar (Macedonian: Лазар) and Venec (Macedonian: Венец) winery.

History

A settlement in the location of modern Negotino existed and developed in antiquity.

Between 278 and 242 BC, a city was founded by King Antigonus II Gonatas, under the name of Antigoneia (Αντιγονεία in Greek). After conquering Paionia, he conquered the settlements around the central Vardar region.

Antigoneia was situated some twelve Roman miles south of the ancient city of Stobi, on the road to Thessaloniki, at the location of modern Gradiste, near the railway station of Negotino. At this place, Roman coins were found, as well as precious jewelry and other archeological findings from the period of the Roman and Byzantine period.

The ancient city existed until the 11th century when it was destroyed by a disastrous earthquake which hit almost all of the territory of Macedonia along with other cities such as Skupi, Stobi, Heraclea, Astibo, and Idomena. 

According to the statistics of Bulgarian ethnographer Vasil Kanchov from 1900, 2,395 inhabitants lived in Negotino, 1,925 Bulgarian Exarchists, 320 Bulgarian Muslims, 90 Vlachs and 60 Romani.

From 1929 to 1941, Negotino was part of the Vardar Banovina of the Kingdom of Yugoslavia.

Transport
The town is served by the Negotino railway station, with connections from Niš in Serbia to the port of Thessaloniki in Greece on the Aegean Sea (Corridor X), with Intercity services to Skopje and Thessaloniki in Greece.

Twin towns — sister cities
Negotino is twinned with:

 Gradiška, Bosnia and Herzegovina, since 2006
  Nagykáta, Hungary, since 2013

References

External links 

 Official website

Cities in North Macedonia
Macedonian colonies
Negotino Municipality